The colon alphabetic letter  is used in a number of languages and phonetic transcription systems, generally for vowel length or tone.
It resembles but differs from the colon punctuation mark, . In some fonts, the two dots are placed a bit closer together than those of the punctuation colon so that the two characters are visually distinct. 
In Unicode it has been assigned the code , which behaves like a letter rather than a punctuation mark in electronic texts. In practice, however, an ASCII colon is frequently used for the letter.

In Windows and macOS, the letter colon can be used to emulate the punctuation colon in file names, where the punctuation colon is a reserved character that cannot be used.

Alphabetic letter
Several of the Native American languages of North America use the colon to indicate vowel length. Zuni is one. Other languages include Hupa of California, Oʼodham of Arizona, Sayula Popoluca of Mexico and Mohawk of Ontario. Still others use a half colon (just the top dot of the colon, or a middot). Both conventions derive from Americanist phonetic notation (below).

The colon is used as a grammatical tone letter in Budu in the Democratic Republic of the Congo, in Sabaot in Kenya, in some Grebo in Liberia, and in several languages of Papua New Guinea: Erima, Gizra, Go꞉bosi, Gwahatike, Kaluli, Kamula, Kasua, Kuni-Boazi and Zimakani.

Phonetic symbol
In Americanist phonetic notation, a colon may be used to indicate vowel length. This convention is somewhat less common than the half-colon.

In the International Phonetic Alphabet, a special triangular colon-like letter is used to indicate that the preceding consonant or vowel is long. Its form is that of two triangles pointing toward each other rather than the two dots of Americanist notation.
If the upper triangle is used without the lower one, it designates a half-long vowel or consonant.

The Uralic Phonetic Alphabet uses .

References

Latin-script letters